Unidirectional may refer to:
 simplex communication, in communications theory
 Half-duplex signaling behavior, using ITU standards
 Uni-directional vehicle, a railcar with controls at one end only